Nicophon (also Nicophron), the son of a certain Theron, was an Athenian comic poet, a contemporary of  Aristophanes in his later years. Athenaeus states that he belonged to Old Comedy, but it is more likely that he belonged to Middle Comedy. We learn from the argument of the Plutus of Aristophanes that he exhibited one of his plays, called Ἄδωνις Adonis, in 388 BC, the date Aristophanes exhibited his Plutus.

Plays 
Ἄδωνις, Adonis
Ἀφροδίτης γοναί, Origins of Aphrodite
Ἐξ Ἅδου ἀνιὼν, Coming Up from Hades
Πανδώρα, Pandora
Ἐγχειρογαστορες, Living by their Hands
Σειρῆνες, Sirens

27 lines of his plays have survived.

References

Meineke, Frag. Poet. Comic, vol. i. p. 256, &c. vol. ii. p. 848, &c. ; *Clinton, F. II. vol. ii. p. 101.) [W. M.G.

Notes
Suidas 
Athenaeus Deipnosophists by Charles Duke Yonge, on the word mystron (spoon), cited by Hippolochus and Nicophon 

Ancient Athenian dramatists and playwrights
Writers of lost works
4th-century BC Athenians
Old Comic poets